40 Odd Years is a compilation box set by American singer-songwriter Loudon Wainwright III, released on May 3, 2011 on Shout! Factory. The set contains music from throughout Wainwright's career, alongside a DVD of live performances and documentary pieces. The collection is co-produced and curated by filmmaker Judd Apatow, who also writes an introduction in the liner notes.

The album's fourth disc features both rare and unreleased tracks, including a newly recorded song for the collection, entitled "Dead Man".

Background
Regarding filmmaker Judd Apatow's involvement in 40 Odd Years, Wainwright noted, "I would see him and he would say, "You gotta have a box!" And I'd say, "Yeah, sure, I agree." But because of his interest and his influence, he was able get together with the people at Shout! Factory and encouraged them to make it happen. And he was also quite involved from the creative side of things. I sent him my choices, and the DVD was pretty much created by him and his team. So, he's a very big part."

Regarding the box set's track listing, Wainwright stated, "I've mourned over the kittens that have been put in the sack, that didn't make it into the box. That was an aspect that was difficult at that stage - choosing what could be included and what couldn't be included because there were digital space requirements. [...] I took one song off because it made my wife wince too much. I cut her some slack. It takes a lot to make me wince; as far as I'm concerned, bad taste is timeless. I like to wince. I like to think that people are going 'Eeeghegh!' I put one song on there that I never had the guts to put on a record - which was this song called "Laid" - so I thought, 'What the hell? I'm almost dead. I'll put it out there'."

On the album's fourth disc of rarities, Wainwright included a duet with him and his ex-wife Kate McGarrigle, entitled "Weave Room Blues". Wainwright stated, "It seemed important to include something with the two of us: "Weave Room Blues' was the choice. [...] We were having a lot of fun. And that was what I wanted to convey with that choice, that we did have fun."

Track listing

Disc 1 (1969–1983)
  	School Days
  	I Don't Care
  	Uptown	
  	Be Careful There's A Baby In The House	
  	Saw Your Name In The Paper	
  	Dead Skunk
  	New Paint	
  	Drinking Song	
  	The Swimming Song	
  	Dilated To Meet You	
  	Down Drinking At The Bar		
  	The Man Who Couldn't Cry	
  	Whatever Happened To Us?		
  	Crime Of Passion		
  	Kick In The Head		
  	Summer's Almost Over	
  	Just Like President Thieu		
  	Golfin’ Blues	
  	The Heckler		
  	Natural Disaster	
  	Red Guitar	
  	Hollywood Hopeful		
  	DTTYWLM
  	The Grammy Song

Disc 2 (1984–1995)
  	Westchester County		
 	I'm Alright	
  	Screaming Issue
  	Unhappy Anniversary		
  	Your Mother And I		
 	Synchronicity	
	Hard Day On The Planet	
	You Don't Want To Know	
	Bill Of Goods	
	Thanksgiving		
	Your Father's Car		
	When I'm At Your House		
	The Picture	
	Men	
	So Many Songs	
	Tip That Waitress		
	I'd Rather Be Lonely	
	April Fool's Day Morn	
	The Acid Song		
	IWIWAL		
	A Year	
	Dreaming

Disc 3 (1996–2010)
  	So Damn Happy		
  	Primrose Hill	
  	Bein’ A Dad		
  	Four Mirrors	
  	It's Love And I Hate It
  	Christmas Morning	
  	Pretty Good Day	
 	White Winos		
  	Bed	
 	Surviving Twin		
  	The Shit Song		
  	Between		
  	My Biggest Fan	
  	When You Leave	
  	Make Your Mother Mad	
  	Daughter	
  	Grey In L.A.	
  	Muse Blues	
  	Motel Blues		
  	The Deal	
  	Rowena	
  	High Wide & Handsome

Disc 4 (Rare and Unreleased)
  	Weave Room Blues (with Kate McGarrigle)		
  	McSorley's		
 	Black Uncle Remus (demo)		
  	Funny Having Money		
  	The Hardy Boys At The Y (with The Boys Of The Lough)	
  	Laid (live)		
 	Outsidey (live)		
 	That Cat		
  	Surfin’ Queen (demo)	
  	Newt	
  	4X10 (live)	
  	Somethin’ Stupid (with Barry Humphries)	
  	The Miles (live)	
  	So Good So Far (live)	
  	Big Fish	
 	No Sure Way	
  	Hey There 2nd Grader		
  	More I Cannot Wish You	
  	Florida (Lucky You)		
  	Hank & Fred (live)	
  	Your Eyes (demo)	
 	Dead Man	
  	At The End Of A Long Lonely Day (with Suzzy Roche)

Disc 5 (DVD: Filmed Performances)
  	One Man Guy - 1993 Dutch television documentary	
  	BBC4 Sessions: Loudon Wainwright: One Man Guy - Filmed at Bush Hall, London, on May 2, 2005 - 4 Song		
  	Loudon Wainwright III at The BBC - Aired on September 23, 2005 - 11 Songs		
  	Dead Man - Filmed on May 24, 2010; recording session documentary		
  	Entertainment Desk - Aired on Canadian television in 1995 - 1 Song with Martha Wainwright
 	High Wide & Handsome – The Charlie Poole Project - Filmed in 2009 for documentary on making of album	
  	The Basement - Filmed in Sydney, Australia in 2008 - 1 Song with Lucy Wainwright Roche
  	Austin City Limits - 5 Songs	
  	Saturday Night Live - Aired on NBC on November 15, 1975 - 2 Songs	
  	The Garfield House - Filmed on May 24, 2010 - 6 Songs
  	826LA Benefit - Filmed on January 16, 2007 - 2 Songs		
  	PBS Soundstage - Aired on February 2, 1977 - 1 Song		
 	McCabe's Guitar Shop - Filmed on February 3, 2007 - 1 Song	
  	The Mike Douglas Show - Aired on April 25, 1978 - Interview and 1 Song	
  	Nightline - Aired on ABC on June 22, 2005 - 1 Song	
  	Carrott Confidential - Aired on BBC on February 14, 1987 - 1 Song

References

Loudon Wainwright III albums
2011 compilation albums
Shout! Factory compilation albums
Works by Judd Apatow